Evelyn Magruder DeJarnette (Magruder; March 4, 1842 – March, 1914) was an American Southern author of the long nineteenth century, who wrote stories in African-American dialect. She contributed to Frank Leslie's Magazine, The Century Magazine, the Atlantic Monthly, and The Youth's Companion.

Early life and education
Evelyn May Magruder was born in Glenmore, Albemarle County, Virginia, March 4, 1842. She was the third child of Benjamin Henry and Maria Minon Magruder. Her father was a prominent Virginia lawyer and legislator, and in 1864, was elected to the Congress of the Confederate States. Her mother's family was from Piedmont Virginia.

During her childhood, she learned about the responsibilities of slave ownership, and became a teacher to the African American children on the plantation.

Magruder attended boarding school for several terms. During her father's connection with the General Assembly, she was a frequent visitor to Richmond, Virginia, where she took part in social gatherings.

Career
In 1870, that she began her literary career in prose and poetry. Frank Leslie's Magazine, The Century Magazine, the Atlantic Monthly, The Youth's Companion, and various newspapers accepted her contributions. Among her publications are "Old Vote for Young Master" and "Out on A' Scurgeon."

Personal life
In 1864, she married Elliott Hawes DeJarnette. He had been farmer, and a large slave owner, who left his studies at the University of Virginia to volunteer early in the Civil war, becoming a captain, and serving with distinction in the Confederate army. At Antietam, he was severely wounded. After marriage, they moved into his family home, "Pine Forest," in Spotsylvania County, Virginia. The DeJarnettes had eight children.

Evelyn Magruder DeJarnette died at "Pine Forest" in Spotsylvania County, Virginia, in March 1914, and is buried in its private cemetery.

References

Attribution

Bibliography

External links
 
 

1842 births
1914 deaths
19th-century American writers
19th-century American women writers
People from Albemarle County, Virginia
Writers from Virginia
People from Spotsylvania County, Virginia
Wikipedia articles incorporating text from A Woman of the Century